Álvaro Rubio Robles (born 18 April 1979) is a Spanish former professional footballer who played as a defensive midfielder.

He spent most of his career with Valladolid, appearing in 310 games in all competitions. In La Liga he also represented Albacete, for a total of 204 matches in that competition over eight seasons (four goals).

Club career

Early years
Born in Logroño, La Rioja, Rubio began his professional career with Real Zaragoza, but never made it past the reserves. In January 2000, he moved to Albacete Balompié – first on loan – where, after a slow start, he became a very important unit for the Castile-La Mancha side in the Segunda División.

After 25 matches in the 2002–03 season, as Albacete returned to La Liga after a seven-year absence, Rubio made his top-division debut on 26 October 2003 in a 3–2 away loss against Real Betis where he came on as a 27th-minute substitute. He made a further 50 appearances until June 2005, when the team were relegated.

Valladolid
For the 2006–07 campaign, Rubio signed with Real Valladolid, being promoted to the top flight in his first year and rarely missing a game subsequently. Mainly a defensive-minded player, he scored his first goals as a professional in 2007–08, the first coming on 28 October 2007 in a 2–2 draw at CA Osasuna (three for the season).

Rubio could only appear in 16 league games in 2009–10 due to injuries, and Valladolid dropped down to division two for the first time in three years. Although still afflicted by physical problems, he helped to another promotion in 2012, contributing 20 starts to the feat and going on to be a regular in the following two top-tier campaigns; he continued to be heavily played as the club returned to the second division.

Abroad
On 8 August 2016, the 37-year-old Rubio moved abroad for the first time in his career, signing for I-League champions Bengaluru FC on a four-month deal. On 30 November, after five appearances in the AFC Cup to help his team reach the final, he left.

International career
Rubio was part of the Spain under-20 squad at the 1999 FIFA World Youth Championship that also included the likes of Iker Casillas and Xavi. He featured in the 3–1 group stage win against Honduras, as the tournament in Nigeria ended in conquest.

Rubio found the net in his only appearance for the under-21 team, a 2–1 home victory over Israel for the 2000 UEFA European Championship qualifiers.

Honours
Valladolid
Segunda División: 2006–07

Spain U20
FIFA World Youth Championship: 1999

References

External links

1979 births
Living people
Sportspeople from Logroño
Spanish footballers
Footballers from La Rioja (Spain)
Association football midfielders
La Liga players
Segunda División players
Segunda División B players
Real Zaragoza B players
Real Zaragoza players
Albacete Balompié players
Real Valladolid players
Bengaluru FC players
Spain youth international footballers
Spain under-21 international footballers
Spanish expatriate footballers
Expatriate footballers in India
Spanish expatriate sportspeople in India